Davide Ruggeri (born 7 May 1999) is an Italian rugby union player.
His usual position is as a Flanker and he currently plays for Zebre Parma in United Rugby Championship.

Selected for F.I.R. Academy squad, in 2018–19 Pro14 season, Ruggeri was named as Additional Player for Zebre and for 2020–21 Pro14 season, under contract with Rovigo Delta in Top12, he was named as Permit Player for Benetton Rugby.

In 2018 and 2019, Ruggeri was named in the Italy Under 20 squad.On the 8 December 2021, he was selected by Alessandro Troncon to be part of an Emerging Italy 27-man squad for the 2021 end-of-year rugby union internationals. On 26 May Ruggeri was called in Italy A squad for the South African tour in the 2022 mid-year rugby union tests against Namibia and Currie Cup XV team.

References

External links 
It's Rugby English Profile
Ultimate Rugby Profile

Sportspeople from Como
Italian rugby union players
Zebre Parma players
1999 births
Living people
Rugby union flankers
Rugby Rovigo Delta players
Benetton Rugby players